Mónica Rodríguez Guzmán (born 3 August 1998) is a Mexican footballer who plays as a defender for the Liga MX Femenil side Club América and the Mexico women's national team.

International career
Rodríguez was part of the Mexico women's national under-17 team who reached the quarter finals of the 2014 FIFA U-17 Women's World Cup.

She made her debut for the senior Mexico women's national team on 12 December 2019, in a 6–0 friendly defeat by Brazil at Arena Corinthians in São Paulo.

References

External links
 
 

1998 births
Living people
Mexican women's footballers
Women's association football defenders
Footballers from Morelos
People from Cuautla
Liga MX Femenil players
Club América (women) footballers
Mexico women's international footballers
Mexican footballers